Frederick Edwin Siefke (March 27, 1870 – April 18, 1893) was an American Major League Baseball player from New York City.

Career
Siefke's only season consisted of 16 games at third base for the 1890 Brooklyn Gladiators during their one and only season in the American Association.  In 58 at bats, he collected eight hits for a .138 batting average that included two doubles and one run scored.

Post-career
Siefke died at the age of 23 of Bright's disease in New York City, and is buried in Green-Wood Cemetery in Brooklyn, New York.

References

External links

1870 births
1893 deaths
19th-century baseball players
Major League Baseball third basemen
Brooklyn Gladiators players
Burials at Green-Wood Cemetery
Baseball players from New York City
Deaths from kidney disease
Lynn (minor league baseball) players